Ramapo High School is a comprehensive four-year public high school in the East Ramapo Central School District, serving 9th to 12th grade students. It is located at 400 Viola Road in Ramapo, New York in Rockland County.

Ramapo High School has only one campus as of September 2010. It previously included the Ramapo Freshman Center, which is now the Kakiat Elementary School. The Freshman Center was established for the purpose of educating freshmen away from the upperclassmen, partially due to space constraints.

History
In 2008, Ramapo High School served 1569 students. 49% of Ramapo High School students were female and 51% of students were male.

Ramapo High School had 43% of students attending a four-year institution and 43% of students attending a two-year institution in 2007. New York state had 29% of students attending a four-year institution and 29% of students attending a two-year institution in 2007. Ramapo High School had a 75% graduation rate with Regents Diploma and a 75% graduation rate with Regents Diploma and Advanced Designation in 2007. 75% of New York state students graduated with Regents Diploma and 79% graduated with Regents Diploma and Advanced Designation in 2007. Ramapo High School had a 30% graduation rate with Regents Diploma and a 30% graduation rate with Regents Diploma and Advanced Designation in 2007. 30% of New York state students graduated with Regents Diploma and 39% graduated with Regents Diploma and Advanced Designation in 2007.

In 2008, Ramapo High School had 56% of students were eligible for free or reduced price lunch programs. New York had 44% of eligible students for free or reduced price lunch programs. Eligibility for the National School Lunch Program is based on family income levels.

Ramapo High School served 13% Limited English Proficient (LEP) students in 2007. LEP students are in the process of acquiring and learning English language skills. The state of New York averaged 7% Limited English Proficient (LEP) students in 2007.

In 2008, Ramapo High School had 13 students for every full-time equivalent teacher. The New York average is 13 students per full-time equivalent teacher. However, after recent renovation and changes prompted by the East Ramapo Central School District Board of Education, projections for class sizes are at a staggering high for the 2010-2011 school year.

In 2008, Ramapo High School was 65% Black, 17% Hispanic, 10% White, 9% Asian/Pacific Islander and < 1% American Indian/Alaskan Native < 1%. The New York State Averages for High School Ethnic Composition is 20% Black, 21% Hispanic, 52% White, 7% Asian/Pacific Islander and < 1% American Indian/Alaskan Native.

East Ramapo Marching Band
Ramapo High School combines with Spring Valley High School, the other high school within the district, to form the East Ramapo Marching Band. The band was featured in the 2004 film The Manchurian Candidate.

Current administration

 Principal: Michael Phillips
 Assistant Principal, 12th Grade & 10th Grade A-F: Augustina West
 Assistant Principal, 9th Grade & 10th Grade G-M: Steven Forman

Courses 
Ramapo High School offers courses on a quarter basis for grades 10, 11 and 12.

In order to graduate, a student must fulfill New York State Graduation Requirements for a New York State Regents Diploma.Exams are given as Midterms, after the first two quarters, and as finals, after all four quarters.

Core courses

English
Foreign Language
History
Mathematics
Physical Education
Science

Electives

Art
BOCES
Foreign Language
Mathematics
Music
Physical Education
Technology

Advanced placement courses

Biology
Chemistry
Calculus AB
Calculus BC
English Language and Composition
English Literature and Composition
US History
World History

College level courses
Syracuse University Project Advance offers courses in Psychology, Public Affairs, Economics, English, Sociology and Speech.

Athletics
As of the 2014-2015 school year, the following sports are offered at Ramapo High School.

Interscholastic sports
FALL SPORTS

JV & Varsity Football
JV & Varsity Boys Soccer
JV & Varsity Girls Soccer
Varsity Girls Swimming
Varsity Girls Volleyball
Varsity Girls Tennis

WINTER SPORTS

JV & Varsity Boys Basketball
JV & Varsity Girls Basketball
JV & Varsity Wrestling
Varsity Male and Female Fencing 
Indoor Boys Track & Field
Indoor Girls Track & Field
Varsity Boys Bowling
Varsity Girls Bowling

SPRING SPORTS

JV & Varsity Baseball
JV & Varsity Softball
Boys Track & Field
Girls Track & Field
Varsity Boys Tennis

Achievements
2003 Men's Varsity Football Team finished the regular season undefeated for first time in school history.

Notable alumni

Connie Sellecca: actress
Audrey Landers: actress
Judy Landers: actress
Doug Besterman: orchestrator
Anne Nathan: actress
Al Cole: professional boxer
Helen Schneider: singer
James Matthew Jones: public health expert and philanthropist
Sean Wright: plastic surgeon 
Marco Katz: musician
Michael Rogers: blogger and fundraiser
Geoff Wolinetz: writer, game show winner

References

External links
 Official website
 East Ramapo Central School District

Public high schools in New York (state)
Schools in Rockland County, New York